Central Punjab is a region within Punjab, Pakistan. It includes Lahore District, Kasur District, Gujranwala District, Jhang District, Khushab District, and Mianwali District.

University of Central Punjab

Central Punjab cricket team

The Central Punjab cricket team represents Central Punjab and Northern Punjab.

References

Punjab, Pakistan
Regions of Pakistan
Punjabi-speaking countries and territories